MSA (Minesweeper Auxiliary) Brolga (1102) was a minesweeper operated by the Royal Australian Navy (RAN) between 1988 and 2003. Launched in 1975 by Australian Shipbuilding Industries, the ship was designed for the Department of Transport as the lighthouse tender Lumen. Originally operating as a supply vessel for lighthouses around northern Queensland and the Torres Strait, the transition in lighthouse lights from acetylene gas to solar power meant there was less demand for the vessel, and by 1988, the Department of Transport was looking to sell the ship.

Around this time, the RAN was looking to acquire vessels under the Craft of Opportunity Program, to serve as auxiliary minesweepers and technology testbeds.

Design and construction
Propulsion machinery consists of a single Mirrlees Blackstone diesel, providing  to drive a single controllable-pitch propeller. Ship sensors were limited to a single I-band navigational radar. Crew complement numbers vary: Jane's Fighting Ships lists 8 crew (including an officer), while the Royal Australian Navy's ship history gives 17.

She was built by Australian Shipbuilding Industries at their facility in Fremantle, Western Australia, and launched in 1975.

Operational history

Department of Transport
As Lumen, the ship was based out of Newfarm, Queensland, and tasked with supplying lighthouses around northern Queensland and the Torres Strait. As lighthouses became more self-sufficient by converting lights from acetylene gas to solar power, demand for the ship decreased. By 1988, the Department of Transport was offering the ship up for sale or disposal.

Royal Australian Navy
Around the same time, the RAN was looking for civilian vessels to lease under the Craft of Opportunity Program (COOP).

In minesweeping configuration, Brolga could be fitted with a Klein Type 590 towed sidescan sonar array, a Mini-Dyad magnetic influence sweep array, an AMASS influence sweep array, and mechanical minesweeping gear. The ship was not armed while in naval service.

During 1989, Brolga was used for testing of the Defence Science and Technology Organisation magnetic influence minesweep.

Brolga was briefly deployed to Bougainville from 3 August to 13 September 1999, in support of the Peace Monitoring Group (PMG) deployed following the end of the Bougainville Civil War in 1998. A second and longer deployment with the PMG commenced in September 2000. Although the ship remained on station for seven months, returning to Sydney on 13 March 2001, personnel were rotated to and from the ship frequently. Activities during the PMG deployments included the transportation of patrol groups and monitoring teams around Bougainville and the surrounding islands, along with peacekeeping patrols and community engagements.

In 2001, Bronga participated in the Australia-United States combined operations exercise Operation Tandem Thrust.

After the s finished entering service in 2002, Brolga was no longer required by the RAN and was marked for disposal. The ship was sold into private hands at auction in late 2003, with a sale price of A$255,000.

Civilian
Following the sale, Brolga was relocated to Fremantle in February 2004. At the time of the sale, the new owner stated the intention of using her as a mothership for a fishing fleet.

Later converted to a diving and salvage platform, the renamed Retriever 1 was suspected to be linked to the disappearance of conman Peter Foster in January 2007. She was detained and searched multiple times by Vanuatuan police, and three of the ship's eight crew were arrested on immigration and firearms charges. Three crew members were charged with harbouring Foster, but they denied the charges. However, according to Andrew Kelman, head of Transnational Crimes Unit for Vanuatu, Peter Foster had claimed he had been on the boat and had tried to make a deal with Kelman implicating the crew.

Citations

References

Books

News and journal articles

Websites and other media

Merchant ships of Australia
Ships built in Western Australia
1975 ships
Minesweepers of the Royal Australian Navy
Fishing ships of Australia
Lighthouse tenders of Australia